Shreechand Makhija (born 20 March 1940) is an Indian film and television actor. He has appeared in a number of serials as well as films and is prominently known for his role of Chaurasia in the Indian sitcom Nukkad on Doordarshan. He has done many types of roles. His last film is Zindagi Tumse (2019)

Filmography

Television

See also

 List of Indian film actors
 List of Indian television actors

References

External links

Living people
Indian VJs (media personalities)
People from Jaipur
Male actors in Hindi cinema
1940 births